Ragged Kingdom is a 2011 album by June Tabor and Oysterband. Tabor and Oysterband had collaborated previously on the 1990 album Freedom and Rain. The majority of the tracks are interpretations of traditional folk songs but also includes covers of Joy Division's "Love Will Tear Us Apart", Bob Dylan's "Seven Curses" PJ Harvey's "That Was My Veil" and the Dan Penn & Chips Moman soul standard "Dark End of the Street".

The album was warmly received with Robin Denselow of The Guardian giving it a 5 star review. The album went on to top fRoots magazine year end poll as best album of 2011.

Track listing

 Bonny Bunch of Roses
 That Was My Veil
 Son David
 Love Will Tear Us Apart
 (When I Was No but) Sweet Sixteen
 Judas (Was a Red-headed Man)
 If My Love Loves Me
 Hills of Shiloh
 Fountains Flowing
 The Leaves of Life
 Seven Curses
 Dark End of the Street

Personnel

 June Tabor - vocals
 John Jones - melodeon, vocals
 Alan Prosser - fiddle, guitar, kantele, vocals
 Ray Cooper - cello, bass guitar, harmonium, mandolin, vocals
 Al Scott - bass guitar, mandola
 Ian Telfer - fiddle
 Dil Davies - drums

Reviews
 Allmusic  [ link]
 The Guardian  link

June Tabor albums
2011 albums
Oysterband albums

pl:Un